Alna is a borough of the city of Oslo, Norway. It is named after the River Alna, which flows through it.

The borough consists of the following neighborhoods:
 Alnabru
 Ellingsrud
 Furuset
 Haugerud
 Hellerud
 Lindeberg
 Trosterud
 Tveita

Demographics

As of January 1, 2020, there were 49,801 people living in the borough. Of these, 24,943 (50.1%) were male. There were 1,495 immigrants from Western countries and 24,943 from Non-Western countries (50%). The countries from where most immigrants originated were Pakistan (5,060), Turkey (1,500), Sri Lanka (1,161), the former Yugoslavia (1,078), and Somalia (756). There were 641 births in the borough in 2018, and 341 deaths. The same year 6,875 people moved into the borough, while 6,767 moved out. In 2018, the average gross income for the borough was NOK 394,000, somewhat lower than the average for the city of NOK 529,400.

Politics 
As a borough of Oslo, Alna is governed by the city council of Oslo as well as its own borough council. The council leader is Mari Morken from the Labour Party and the deputy leader is Sunniva Bratsberg, of the Socialist Left Party. The Labour Party has the most seats. The 15 seats are distributed among the following political parties for the 2019-2023 term:

• 6 from the Labour Party (Arbeiderpartiet)

• 2 from the Progress Party (Fremskrittspartiet)

• 2 from the Conservative Party (Høyre)

• 2 from the Red Party (Rødt)

• 2 from the Socialist Left Party (Sosialistisk Venstreparti)

• 1 from the Green Party (Miljøpartiet de Grønne)

References

Boroughs of Oslo
Ethnic enclaves in Norway